Sir Valentine Browne, 1st Viscount Kenmare and 3rd Baronet Browne of Molahiffe (1638–1694), was an Irish Jacobite who fought for James II of England in the Williamite War in Ireland.

Birth and origins 

Valentine was born in 1638. He was the eldest son of Valentine Browne and Mary MacCarthy. His father was the 2nd Baronet Browne of Molahiffe, County Kerry.

His mother was a daughter of Charles MacCarthy, 1st Viscount Muskerry. His mother's family were the MacCarthys of Muskerry, a Gaelic Irish dynasty that branched from the MacCarthy-Mor line with Dermot MacCarthy, second son of Cormac MacCarthy-Mor, a medieval Prince of Desmond. This second son had been granted the Muskerry area as appanage.

He was one of four siblings, who are listed in his father's article.

Early life 
Browne succeeded his father in 1640 as the 3rd Baronet Browne at the age of two. As a child he was a ward of Donough MacCarty, 2nd Viscount Muskerry, his maternal uncle. Muskerry fought with the Irish Catholic Confederates against the Irish government, the English Parliament and the Cromwellians in the Irish Rebellion of 1641, the Irish Confederate Wars and the Cromwellian conquest of Ireland. Muskerry made Ross Castle, which belonged to Browne, his last stand against Cromwell's General Edmund Ludlow, surrendered on 27 June 1652 and went into exile.

Marriage and children 
Sir Valentine married Jane Plunkett, only daughter and heir of Sir Nicholas Plunkett of Balrath, County Meath, the lawyer and Confederate politician.

 
Valentine and Jane had five sons:
 Nicholas (about 1660 – 1720), 2nd Viscount Browne
 Ossory (died 1666), without issue
 Patrick (died 1675) without issue
 James (died 1680) without issue
 Valentine, died without issue

—and four daughters:
 Mary (died 1703), married 1685 George Aylmer of Lyons, County Kildare
 Ellis, married  Nicholas Purcell, Baron of Loughmoe
 Thomasine, married Nicholas Bourke of Cahirmoil, County Limerick
 Katherine, married the Portuguese ambassador in London, Dom Luís da Cunha

Restoration 
Sir Valentine received some lands under the Act of Settlement of 1662.

Jacobite 
Sir Valentine commanded a regiment in the Irish army and seems to have been taken prisoner at the Battle of Aughrim in 1691.

Viscount Kenmare 
Sir Valentine was created 1st Viscount Kenmare and Baron Castlerosse (after Ross Castle) on 20 May 1689, by King James II, after his deposition by the English Parliament, but while he still possessed his rights as King of Ireland. At the time James was presiding over the short-lived Patriot Parliament. The peerage remained on the Irish patent roll in a constitutionally ambiguous position, but was not recognized by the Protestant political establishment.

Catholicism and Death 
The 1st Viscount Kenmare wrote in his will that he wanted to be buried in "some decent Catholic church, monastery, abbey, or graveyard". He was therefore Catholic despite the English origin of his family. He died in 1694 and was succeeded by his eldest son Nicholas.

Notes and references

Notes

Citations

Sources 

 
 
  – (for Kenmare)
  – G to K (for Kenmare)
  – 1611 to 1625 (for Browne)
  – Canonteign to Cutts (for Clancarty)
 
  – Barons
  – (for the 2nd Viscount Kenmare)
  – Irish stem
 
 

 
 

 

1638 births
1694 deaths
Valentine
Irish Jacobites
Irish soldiers in the army of James II of England
Members of the Irish House of Lords
Peers of Ireland created by James II
Viscounts in the Peerage of Ireland
Viscounts in the Jacobite peerage